Davyhulme is an area of Urmston in Greater Manchester, England, historically in Lancashire. The population at the 2011 census was 19,634.

Davyhulme Sewage Works

The area is notable for Davyhulme Sewage Works, one of the largest wastewater treatment plants in Europe. Opened in 1894, the site is operated by United Utilities and serves a population of 1.2 million in and around the city of Manchester. The facility includes a biogas combined heat and power facility, producing renewable energy from gas produced by the anaerobic digestion of sewage.

Parks

Davyhulme Millennium Nature Reserve is a green area set along the Manchester Ship Canal, formerly part of the waterworks site. It is popular with dog-walkers, and children on bicycles. The area is owned by United Utilities.

Davyhulme Park is a green flag awarded park in the area. It contains two large wildlife ponds, two bowling greens, tennis courts, children's playgrounds and a rose garden.

Trafford General Hospital

Trafford General Hospital opened in 1929 and was originally called Davyhulme Park Hospital. It became the first NHS hospital in 1948.

Politics
Davyhulme is divided into the electoral wards of Davyhulme East and Davyhulme West. Part of Urmston is in Davyhulme East and some of neighbouring Flixton in Davyhulme West. The area generally elects Conservative Councillors. However at the 2018 Local elections, 2 Labour Councillors were elected by the two wards.

It is in the parliamentary constituency of Stretford and Urmston, but until the 1997 general election it gave its name to the Davyhulme constituency. Winston Churchill's grandson, also called Winston Churchill, was the Conservative MP for more than 25 years, but since 1997 Labour Party MPs have been elected.

Notable people
Stuart Adamson, guitarist, singer The Skids and Big Country
Peter Collins, world champion speedway rider
Charles Ewart, Scottish war hero, spent the last 16 years of his life here
Karl Green, bassist, vocalist with 60s pop group Herman's Hermits, musician, songwriter
Keith Hopwood, guitarist, keyboards, vocalist with pop group Herman's Hermits, record producer, composer, businessman
Ian McShane, actor
Steve Milner, cricketer
Morrissey, former lead singer of The Smiths
Jim Noir (real name Alan Roberts), composer, producer and multi-instrumentalist
Peter Noone, singer with pop group Herman's Hermits
David Andrew Phoenix, biochemist
Nicky Reid, footballer 
Paul Stenning, author

See also

Listed buildings in Urmston

References

Areas of Greater Manchester
Geography of Trafford